The 2017 Rhythmic Gymnastics World Championships, the 35rd edition, was held in Pesaro, Italy, from 30 August to 3 September 2017.

Participating countries
List of delegations participating in Championship.

Medal winners

* reserve gymnast

Individual

Individual Qualification
Source:

Team competition is Not contested in a Post Olympic Year, only individual qualifications for the apparatus finals and the all-around. The top 8 scores in individual apparatus qualifies to the apparatus finals and the top 24 in overall qualification scores advance to the all-around final.

Hoop 
Source:

Ball
Source:

Clubs
Source:

Ribbon
Source:

All-Around
Source:

Groups

Group All-Around
Source:
The top 8 scores in the apparatus qualifies to the group apparatus finals and the top 8 in overall qualification scores advance to the group all-around final.

5 Hoops
Source:

3 Balls + 2 Ropes
Source:

Medal table

References

External links
 

World Rhythmic Gymnastics Championships
Rhythmic Gymnastics World Championships
Sport in Pesaro
International gymnastics competitions hosted by Italy
World Rhythmic Gymnastics Championships
Sport in le Marche
August 2017 sports events in Europe
September 2017 sports events in Europe